Robert C. Moot (June 1, 1911 – May 31, 2002) was an American administrator who served as Administrator of the Small Business Administration from 1967 to 1968.

References

1911 births
2002 deaths
Administrators of the Small Business Administration
People from Orange, New Jersey